Colin Banton (born 15 September 1969) is a South African born former English cricketer. Banton was a right-handed batsman. He was born in Fish Hoek, Cape Province.

Banton made his first-class debut for Nottinghamshire in 1995. He made 6 further first-class appearances for the county that season, the last coming against Warwickshire in the County Championship.  In his 7 first-class appearances for Nottinghamshire, he scored 292 runs at a batting average of 29.20, with 2 half centuries and a high score of 80*.  His highest score came on debut against Cambridge University.  In that same season he made his List A debut for the county against Lancashire in the 1995 Benson & Hedges Cup. His second and final List A appearance came in the same season against Essex.  In his 2 matches, he scored 41 runs at an average of 20.50, with a high score of 40.

After leaving Nottinghamshire, he made a single MCCA Knockout Trophy appearance for Buckinghamshire in 1996 against Devon.   He also previously had played Second XI cricket for the Middlesex Second XI in 1993.

References

External links

1969 births
Living people
People from Fish Hoek
English people of South African descent
English cricketers
Nottinghamshire cricketers
Buckinghamshire cricketers
Cricketers from the Western Cape